Tito Celani (born February 18, 1921, date of death unknown) was an Italian professional football player.

External links

1921 births
Year of death missing
Italian footballers
Serie A players
Ascoli Calcio 1898 F.C. players
Inter Milan players
U.S. Lecce players
S.S.D. Sanremese Calcio players
Association football midfielders
U.S. Imperia 1923 players
S.G. Gallaratese A.S.D. players